Joseph Holmes Gettins OBE, DSO, BA (19 November 1873 – 6 June 1954) was an English amateur footballer who played as a centre forward. He is best remembered for his association with Millwall Athletic and he played in the Football League for hometown club Middlesbrough.

Club career

Millwall Athletic 
An amateur centre forward, Gettins' longest association was with Millwall Athletic, playing for the club in multiple spells between 1892 and 1904, by which time the club was simply known as Millwall. He scored an impressive 69 goals in 71 appearances with the club and won the 1894–95 and 1895–96 Southern League titles back to back, in addition to two United League titles and two FA Cup semi-finals.

Middlesbrough 
Gettins appeared for hometown club Middlesbrough in four spells and was a part of the club's 1894–95 FA Amateur Cup-winning team. He also helped the club to the 1896–97 Northern League title and played in Middlesbrough's first ever Football League match against Lincoln City on 2 September 1899.

Brentford 
Gettins had a short spell with non-League club Brentford during the 1894–95 season and his student friends inadvertently created the club's Bees nickname, by chanting Borough Road College's war-cry "buck up Bs" at a match. He made three cup appearances for the club.

Representative career 
Gettins was one of 14 players included in Corinthian squad which toured South Africa in 1897, the first English team to play outside Europe.

Personal life 
Gettins served as a captain (being promoted to a temporary major for a time) in the Royal Army Service Corps Territorial Force during the First World War. He was awarded the DSO in 1918. Before and after the war, Gettins worked in various teaching roles at Isleworth School, Borough Road College, Reading University and Liverpool University. In 1920, he returned to the army and became Chief Education Officer of the Army Education Corps and later commanded the Army School of Education, having risen to the rank of lieutenant colonel by the time of his retirement in 1933. Gettins was awarded an OBE in 1933.

Career statistics

Honours 
Millwall Athletic
 Southern League First Division (2): 1894–95, 1895–96
 United League (2): 1896–97, 1898–99
Middlesbrough
 Northern League (1): 1896–97
 FA Amateur Cup (1): 1894–95

References

English footballers
Footballers from Middlesbrough
Brentford F.C. players
English Football League players
Association football forwards
Millwall F.C. players
1954 deaths
Middlesbrough F.C. players
Corinthian F.C. players
Southern Football League players
Officers of the Order of the British Empire
Companions of the Distinguished Service Order
British Army personnel of World War I
Royal Army Service Corps officers
Northern Football League players
Royal Army Educational Corps officers
1873 births
Military personnel from Yorkshire